Chamikara Mudalige (born 5 July 1976) is a Sri Lankan former cricketer. He played in 124 first-class and 62 List A matches between 1995/96 and 2011/12. He made his Twenty20 debut on 17 August 2004, for Nondescripts Cricket Club in the 2004 SLC Twenty20 Tournament.

References

External links
 

1976 births
Living people
Sri Lankan cricketers
Burgher Recreation Club cricketers
Colombo Cricket Club cricketers
Galle Cricket Club cricketers
Moors Sports Club cricketers
Nondescripts Cricket Club cricketers
Place of birth missing (living people)